Ingleside is a city primarily in San Patricio County, with small parts in Nueces County, in the U.S. state of Texas. Its population was 9,519 at the 2020 census.

Geography 
According to the United States Census Bureau, the city has a total area of 14.5 sq mi (37.6 km), of which 0.1 sq mi (0.3 km) (0.76%) is covered by water.  The city is almost entirely in San Patricio County, with slivers to the southeast in Nueces County.

Demographics

2020 census 

As of the 2020 United States census, there were 9,519 people, 3,349 households, and 2,417 families residing in the city.

2000 census 
As of the census of 2000,  9,388 people, 2,980 households, and 2,226 were  families residing in the city. The population density was 652.1 people/sq mi (251.7/km). The 3,268 housing units  averaged 227.0/sq mi (87.6/km). The racial makeup of the city was 77.56% White, 5.60% African American, 0.88% Native American, 1.86% Asian, 0.27% Pacific Islander, 10.18% from other races, and 3.64% from two or more races. Hispanics or Latinos of any race were 27.71% of the population.

Of the 2,980 households,  45.4% had children under 18 living with them, 60.7% were married couples living together, 9.5% had a female householder with no husband present, and 25.3% were not families. About 20.0% of all households were made up of individuals, and 5.5% had someone living alone who was 65 or older. The average household size was 2.87, and the average family size was 3.33.

In the city, the age distribution was 29.8% under 18, 15.9% from 18 to 24, 33.3% from 25 to 44, 15.1% from 45 to 64, and 5.9% who were 65  or older. The median age was 28 years. For every 100 females, there were 119.7 males. For every 100 females age 18 and over, there were 126.6 males.

Males had a median income of $30,051 versus $20,847 for females. The per capita income for the city was $16,050. About 7.2% of families and 19.2% of the population were below the poverty line, including 12.9% of those under age 18 and 9.8% of those age 65 or over.

History 
Ingleside was the home to Naval Station Ingleside. On August 24, 2005, the BRAC Commission voted to close the base.  In 2010, the main base property was turned over to the Port of Corpus Christi.

Arts and culture 
Ingleside Public Library contains books, media, and access to online services.

Education 
Most of the City of Ingleside is served by the Ingleside Independent School District. Small sections are in the Aransas Pass Independent School District.

Emory Bellard, the father of the wishbone offense, began his coaching career at Ingleside High School in 1952, where he would stay until 1954. He led the Mustangs football team to the equivalent of a state championship in 1953 and 1954.

Notes

References

External links 

 Ingleside official website
 Ingleside Chamber of Commerce

Cities in Nueces County, Texas
Cities in San Patricio County, Texas
Cities in Texas
Corpus Christi metropolitan area
Populated coastal places in Texas